Kachakorn Warasiha (born 27 June 1994) is a Thai judoka. She is a gold medalist in the women's 52 kg event at the 2019 Southeast Asian Games held in the Philippines. She is also a bronze medalist in this event at the 2018 Asian Games held in Jakarta, Indonesia.

Career 

She won one of the bronze medals in the women's 52 kg event at the 2018 Asian Games held in Jakarta, Indonesia.

In 2019, she competed in the women's 52 kg event at the World Judo Championships held in Tokyo, Japan. She was eliminated in her second match by Joana Ramos of Portugal. In the same year, she won the gold medal in the women's 52 kg event at the 2019 Southeast Asian Games held in the Philippines.

In 2021, she lost her bronze medal match in her event at the Asian-Pacific Judo Championships held in Bishkek, Kyrgyzstan. A few months later, she represented Thailand at the 2020 Summer Olympics in Tokyo, Japan. She competed in the women's 52 kg event where she was eliminated in her first match by Soumiya Iraoui of Morocco.

Achievements

References

External links 
 

Living people
1994 births
Place of birth missing (living people)
Kachakorn Warasiha
Judoka at the 2018 Asian Games
Kachakorn Warasiha
Asian Games medalists in judo
Medalists at the 2018 Asian Games
Southeast Asian Games medalists in judo
Kachakorn Warasiha
Kachakorn Warasiha
Competitors at the 2015 Southeast Asian Games
Competitors at the 2019 Southeast Asian Games
Judoka at the 2020 Summer Olympics
Kachakorn Warasiha
Kachakorn Warasiha